The 1993 Critérium du Dauphiné Libéré was the 45th edition of the cycle race and was held from 31 May to 7 June 1993. The race started in Charbonnières-les-Bains and finished in Aix-les-Bains. The race was won by Laurent Dufaux of the ONCE team.

Teams
Fourteen teams, containing a total of 108 riders, participated in the race:

 
 
 
 
 
 
 
 
 
 
 
 Sicasal–Acral
 La William

Route

General classification

References

Further reading
 
 
 
 
 
 
 
 

1993
1993 in French sport
May 1993 sports events in Europe
June 1993 sports events in Europe